McClung is a surname. Notable people with the surname include:

 A. Colin McClung, agricultural scientist
 Alexander Keith McClung (1811–1855), diplomat
 Charles McClung McGhee (1828–1907), railroad tycoon and financier
 Charles McClung (1761–1835), politician, and surveyor
 Clarence Erwin McClung (1870–1946), biologist
 John & Emery McClung, musicians
 John McClung (1935–2004), historian and jurist
 John Alexander McClung (1891 – 1942), American singer-songwriter
 Kiel McClung (born 1985), soccer player
 Lee McClung (1870–1914), football player and Treasurer of the United States
 Leland S. McClung (1910–2000), American bacteriologist
 Mac McClung (born 2000), American basketball player; nephew of Seth McClung (below)
 Matthew McClung, football coach
 Megan McClung (1972–2006), military officer
 Nellie McClung (1873–1951), feminist, politician, and social activist
 Patrick McClung, special effects artist
 Seth McClung (born 1981), American baseball player
 Tom McClung (born 1957), jazz pianist
 William McClung (1758–1811), judge
 Willie McClung, football player

See also
 A. J. McClung Memorial Stadium
 Edmonton-McClung, electoral district in Alberta
 Frank H. McClung Museum
 Katzenbach v. McClung
 McClung, West Virginia